2013 UEFA European Under-17 Football Championship elite round was the second round of qualifications for the final tournament of UEFA U-17 Championship 2013. The 28 teams advancing from the qualifying round were distributed into seven groups of four teams each, with each group contesting in a round-robin format, with one of the four teams hosting all six group games. The seven group-winning teams automatically qualified for the final tournament in Slovakia.

Seeding
The draw for the elite round was held on 5 December 2012. Each team was placed in one of four drawing pots, according to their qualifying round results. The seven sides with the best records were placed in Pot A, and so forth until Pot D, which contained the seven teams with the weakest records. During the draw, each group was filled with one team from every pot, with the only restriction being that teams that played each other in the first qualifying round can not be drawn into the same group again.

{| class="wikitable"
|-
! width=170|Pot A
! width=170|Pot B
! width=170|Pot C
! width=180|Pot D
|-
|
|
|
|

Tiebreakers
If two or more teams are equal on points on completion of the group matches, the following criteria are applied to determine the rankings.
 Higher number of points obtained in the group matches played among the teams in question
 Superior goal difference from the group matches played among the teams in question
 Higher number of goals scored in the group matches played among the teams in question
 If, after applying criteria 1) to 3) to several teams, two teams still have an equal ranking, the criteria 1) to 3) will be reapplied to determine the ranking of these teams. If this procedure does not lead to a decision, criteria 5) and 6) will apply
 Results of all group matches:
 Superior goal difference
 Higher number of goals scored
 Drawing of lots
Additionally, if two teams which have the same number of points and the same number of goals scored and conceded play their last group match against each other and are still equal at the end of that match, their final rankings are determined by the penalty shoot-out and not by the criteria listed above. This procedure is applicable only if a ranking of the teams is required to determine the group winner.

Group 1

Group 2

Group 3

Group 4

Group 5

Group 6

Group 7

Qualified nations

1 Only counted appearances for under-17 era (bold indicates champion for that year, while italic indicates hosts)

References

External links
 uefa.com

Qualification
UEFA European Under-17 Championship qualification